Ernestia may refer to:

Ernestia, an alternative scientific name for Agdistis, genus of moths in the family Pterophoridae
Ernestia, an alternative scientific name for Panzeria, a genus of flies in the family Tachinidae
Ernestia (plant) DC., 1828, a genus of plant in the family Melastomataceae